The Lyceum of the Philippines University–Batangas (formerly Lyceum of Batangas) is a higher education institution located in Capitol Site, Batangas City. It was founded by Dr. Sotero H. Laurel in 1966 using the educational philosophy of his father, former President José P. Laurel. Serving as the Lyceum of the Philippines University's affiliate satellite campus in the province of Batangas, its flagship courses were Nursing, Medical Technology, Marine Engineering, and Customs Administration. Now, Lyceum of the Philippines University has 42 degree & non-degree programs offerings. The school employs over 500 teaching and non-teaching personnel to cater to the needs of its 10,000 student population, the biggest amongst all Lyceum campuses.

Institution
LPU Batangas enjoys autonomous status from the Commission on Higher Education. The university is also ISO 9001:2015 certified by Certification International (CI) and enjoys the Institutional Accreditation from the Philippine Association of Colleges and Universities Commission on Accreditation (PACUCOA) attributed to the number of LEVEL IV-Accredited Programs as follows: Accountancy, Business Administration, Marine Engineering, Marine Transportation, Information Technology, Hospitality and Tourism, Liberal Arts & Nursing programs. Relentless in giving justice to its "Take the Lead" tagline, Lyceum of the Philippines University in Batangas reaped another "first" as the Investors in People (IiP) Philippine Recognition Panel awards IiP recognition to the university and being the FIRST GOLD IiP-RECOGNIZED UNIVERSITY in the Philippines. Achieving the IiP Standard, LPU Batangas is the first academic institution to be IiP-recognized in the entire country. In December 2012, President Benigno S. Aquino III formally recognized Lyceum of the Philippines University – Batangas in the 15th Philippine Quality Award conferment ceremonies held in Malacañang Palace.

LPU Batangas is a member of the National Collegiate Athletic Association (Philippines) South.

Colleges and Graduate School
College of Allied Medical Professions
College of Nursing
College of Business Administration
College of Computer Studies
College of Education, Arts and Sciences
College of International Tourism and Hospitality Management
College of Criminal Justice Education
College of Dentistry
College of Engineering
Lyceum International Maritime Academy
LPU Graduate School
LPU High School-Batangas
Expanded Tertiary Education Equivalency & Accreditation Program (ETEEAP)

See also
 Lyceum of the Philippines University-Laguna
 Lyceum of the Philippines University-Cavite
 Jose P. Laurel

References

External links
 

Batangas
Liberal arts colleges in the Philippines
Universities and colleges in Batangas
Laurel family
Education in Batangas City
Educational institutions established in 1966
1966 establishments in the Philippines

pam:Lyceum of the Philippines University
tl:Pamantasang Liseo ng Pilipinas